The Whitney Hill Wind Farm is a 24-turbine wind farm near Mount Pulaski in southeastern Logan County in the U.S. state of Illinois.  The project was developed by Enel Green Power.

Detail
The Whitney Hill complex's 24 wind turbines were completed in December 2019.    The project was designed to generate a maximum of 65.3 megawatts of electricity. The Whitney Hill complex utilizes leasehold rights to 5,000 acres of land.

References

Energy infrastructure completed in 2019
Wind farms in Illinois
Buildings and structures in Logan County, Illinois